The 1874 Midhurst by-election was fought on 23 September 1874.  The byelection was fought due to the succession to a peerage of the incumbent Conservative MP, Charles Perceval.  It was won by the Conservative candidate Sir Henry Holland who was unopposed.

References

1874 elections in the United Kingdom
1874 in England
19th century in Sussex
By-elections to the Parliament of the United Kingdom in Sussex constituencies
November 1874 events
Unopposed by-elections to the Parliament of the United Kingdom in English constituencies